Maybe Dolls were an Australian pop music band consisting of siblings Annalisse Morrow (bass guitar, lead vocals) and Chris Morrow (lead guitar, lead vocals). The pair were former members of a power pop group, the Numbers. They had issued a single, "A Five Letter Word", in mid-1980, which reached No. 40 on the Kent Music Report Singles Chart.

Formation
The Morrows formed Maybe Dolls in 1991 in Sydney as a pop music trio with Paul Wheeler on drums (ex-Icehouse). Tim Powles (ex-Venetians) later took over on drums. In July 1992 Chris Morrow reflected on the differences between the two groups, "With our former band, The Numbers, I used to write most of the material. I tended to focus on lyrics and guitar riffs but being a singer Annalisse broadens the songs melodically. Now the voice is serving the lyrics and vice versa — the songs have got both form and content." The Canberra Times reviewer felt that "Annalisse's unique vocal style — equal parts pixie and banshee — has been enriched by stints singing jazz and blues in small clubs and even some techno-funk dabblings."

Their debut single, "Nervous Kid", was released in August 1991, and reached No. 32 on the ARIA Singles Chart. It was featured in the Australian TV soap opera, E Street. At the ARIA Music Awards of 1992 "Nervous Kid" was nominated for Breakthrough Artist – Single.

A second single, "Cool Jesus", reached No. 31 in February 1992, followed by their only album, Propaganda (2 March 1992), which reached the top 30. To record the album the Morrows were joined in the studio by Paul Gray on keyboards (ex-Wa Wa Nee), Peter Kekel on keyboards (ex-Jimmy Barnes Band), Justin Stanley on keyboards (ex-Noiseworks), and John Watson on drums. Annalise explained that "the songs were written over a three year period so they cover lots of ground. I guess lyrically they're all about applying personal politics to the world outside. A lot of them work on a number of different levels so they sort of keep people guessing what they may be about."

Break-up
After disbanding Annalisse left the music industry and Chris became a design teacher in northern New South Wales. In January 2008 Annalisse told The Sydney Morning Heralds correspondent that "'The one thing I miss is singing,' she says, adding with a laugh, 'And I still can't get used to getting up in the morning... It got to the point where I couldn't listen to anybody singing for quite some time'."

Discography

Studio albums

Singles

Awards and nominations

ARIA Music Awards
The ARIA Music Awards is an annual awards ceremony that recognises excellence, innovation, and achievement across all genres of Australian music. They commenced in 1987.

! 
|-
|1992
| "Nervous Kid"
| ARIA Award for Breakthrough Artist - Single
| 
|
|-

References

Australian pop rock groups
Musical groups established in 1991
Musical groups disestablished in 1993
Musical groups from Sydney
RCA Records artists
Sony BMG artists